The Georgia national unde-17 football team represents the country of Georgia in association football at the under-17 youth level, and is controlled by the Georgian Football Federation.

The team is for Georgian players aged 17 or under at the start of a two-year European Under-17 Football Championship cycle, so players can be up to 19 years old.

Competition history
Prior to Georgia's independence in 1991 Georgian players were eligible for selection to the Soviet Union U-16 team. Following the dissolution of the Soviet Union, the Georgian Football Federation was admitted to UEFA as a full member in 1992, and the team played their first competitive matches in the first phase of the qualifying tournament for the 1994 European U-16 Championship. Georgia U-17's competitive debut came on 21 October 1993 against Switzerland U-17 and they finished their first qualifying campaign as 3rd out of 3 teams, behind Switzerland and Slovenia.

The team's first successful campaign was for the 1997 European U-16 Championship, in which they failed to progress from the group stage after three defeats to Hungary, Italy and Belgium. Their second appearance came in the first tournament staged following UEFA's realignment of youth levels in the 2002 European U-17 Championship, in which they were knocked out in the quarter-final by later champions Switzerland U-17s. In 2012 Georgia made it through to the semi-finals but lost 2–0 to the Netherlands.

European Championship

European Under 17 Championship Qualifiers Host in Georgia

Current squad
 The following players were called up for the 2023 UEFA European Under-17 Championship qualification matches.
 Match dates: 25 – 31 October 2022
 Opposition: ,  and Caps and goals correct as of:''' 28 October 2022, after the match against

References

Georgian under 17 (not friendly)

External links
Official website of the Georgian Football Federation

European national under-17 association football teams
under-17